Jacek Duchowski (born 2 January 1966) is a Polish footballer. He played in one match for the Poland national football team in 1990.

References

External links
 
 

1966 births
Living people
Polish footballers
Poland international footballers
People from Świnoujście
Association football defenders
Pogoń Szczecin players
Olimpia Poznań players
GKS Katowice players